Jailer is an upcoming Indian Tamil-language action comedy film written and directed by Nelson and produced by Kalanithi Maran of Sun Pictures. It stars Rajinikanth, Shiva Rajkumar, Tamannaah, Ramya Krishnan and Mohanlal

The film was officially announced in February 2022 with the working title Thalaivar 169, being the 169th film of Rajinikanth, while the official title Jailer was announced in June. Filming began in August 2022. The music is composed by Anirudh Ravichander.

Cast

Production

Development 
On 10 February 2022, Sun Pictures officially announced their next film starring Rajinikanth and to be directed by Nelson. As Rajinikanth's 169th film, it was tentatively titled Thalaivar 169. The title Jailer was announced on 17 June 2022, with the posters revealing Nelson as the sole writer, dismissing earlier reports that K. S. Ravikumar would be writing the screenplay from a story by Rajinikanth. Cinematography is handled by Vijay Karthik Kannan, and editing by R. Nirmal. This also marks the first collaboration of Nelson with Rajinikanth.

Casting 
In May 2022, there were reports suggesting that Kannada actor Shiva Rajkumar would be seen in a pivotal role. That speculation was confirmed the following month. It marks Shiva Rajkumar's debut in Tamil cinema. In early August, Vasanth Ravi was confirmed to be part of the film. Shortly thereafter, on 10 August, Ramya Krishnan confirmed her participation, and on 23 August, Malayalam actor Vinayakan was confirmed. In July 2022, there were reports suggesting that Yogi Babu would be a part of the film. That speculation was confirmed on 24 August 2022 by Sun Pictures. On 6 January 2023, it was announced that Mohanlal would do a cameo role in the film. He allotted a two-day call-sheet for the film on 8 and 9 January. Almost two weeks later, Sunil and Tamannaah were announced as part of the cast. In February, Jackie Shroff was announced to be a part of the film.

Filming 
Test shoots took place in late July in Chennai, and principal photography was set to commence on 3 August in Hyderabad. However, the start of filming was indefinitely delayed due to a strike in Hyderabad which was expected to last at least three weeks. Filming ultimately began on 22 August in Chennai. By October, filming was also taking place in Cuddalore. In January 2023, a small filming schedule began in Jaisalmer. The following month, filming began in Mangalore.

Music 
The music is composed by Anirudh Ravichander in his third collaboration with Rajinikanth, after Petta (2019) and Darbar (2020) and fourth collaboration with Nelson after Kolamaavu Kokila (2018), Doctor (2021), and Beast (2022).

References

External links 
 

Films directed by Nelson (director)
Films scored by Anirudh Ravichander
Indian action comedy films
Sun Pictures films
Upcoming Tamil-language films